W